Jack Smith (born 9 July 1999, on the Gold Coast) is an Australian racing driver who currently races in the Repco Supercars Championship, driving for Brad Jones Racing in the No. 4 Chevrolet Camaro ZL1. 

Smith made his Supercars Championship debut as a wildcard entry at the 2019 Tasmania SuperSprint for Brad Jones Racing.

Personal life
Smith is the youngest son of Peter Smith, founder of the Specialized Container Transport (SCT) Group.

Career results

Complete Australian Formula 4 Championship results 
(key) (Races in bold indicate pole position) (Races in italics indicate fastest lap)

Complete Super2 Series results
(key) (Round results only)

Complete Bathurst 12 Hour results

Supercars Championship results
(Races in bold indicate pole position) (Races in italics indicate fastest lap)

Complete Bathurst 1000 results

References

External links
Jack Smith V8 Supercars Official Profile
Driver Database profile
Racing Reference profile

Australian racing drivers
1999 births
Living people
Supercars Championship drivers
Australian Endurance Championship drivers
Matt Stone Racing drivers
Australian F4 Championship drivers